Futebol Clube Lica-Lica Lemorai, commonly known as Lica-Lica Lemorai is an East Timorese football club based in Viqueque. The team plays in the Liga Futebol Amadora.

Competition records

Liga Futebol Amadora 
2016: 3rd place in Groub B Segunda Divisao

Taça 12 de Novembro
2016: 1st Round

References

Football clubs in East Timor
Football